Rudolph Carl Gorman (July 26, 1931 – November 3, 2005) was a Native American artist of the Navajo Nation. Referred to as "the Picasso of American Indian artists" by The New York Times, his paintings are primarily of Native American women and characterized by fluid forms and vibrant colors, though he also worked in sculpture, ceramics, and stone lithography. He was also an avid lover of cuisine, authoring four cookbooks, (with accompanying drawings) called Nudes and Food.

Early life and education
Rudolph Carl Gorman was born in Chinle, Arizona. His mother was Adele Katherine Brown and his father was Carl Nelson Gorman. His father, Carl, was one of the original twenty-nine Navajo Code Talkers, who, along with his colleagues, developed the unbreakable code American forces used in the Pacific Theater during World War II.

R. C. Gorman grew up in a traditional Navajo hogan, and began drawing at age 3. His grandmother helped raise him, recounting Navajo legends and enumerating his genealogy of artist ancestors. She kindled his desire to become an artist. While tending sheep in Canyon de Chelly with his aunts, he used to draw on the rocks, sand, and mud, and made sculptures with the clay, with his earliest subjects including Mickey Mouse and Shirley Temple.

He credited a teacher, Jenny Lind at Ganado Presbyterian Mission School, for his inspiration to become a full-time artist. After he left high school, he served in the United States Navy before entering college, where he majored in literature and minored in art at Northern Arizona University.

In 1958, he received the first scholarship from the Navajo Tribal Council to study outside of the United States, and enrolled in the art program at Mexico City College. There he learned of and was influenced by the work of Diego Rivera. He later studied art at San Francisco State University, where he also worked as a model. He was openly gay.

Career
Gorman had professional art career from 1963 (his first public exhibition by an established gallery) until his death in 2005 – 42 years. During which time he produced over 500 lithographic and serigraphic works, at least 28 Bronze Sculptures, as well as an unknown number of papercasts, ceramic editions, tapestries, glass etchings, and one-of-a-kind oil and acrylic paintings, oil pastel drawings, and sketches.

1963 - R.C. Gorman held his first exhibition at the Zieniewics Gallery in San Francisco, CA

1964 - Gorman visits Taos and meets Henry Manchester and Dorothy Brett. A show is arranged for the next year.

1964 - R.C. and his father Carl N. Gorman are invited to do a two-person show, "New Directions in American Indian Art", at the Philbrook Art Center in Tulsa, OK.

1965 - R.C. and Carl exhibit together at the Heard Museum's Gallery of Indian Art in Phoenix, Arizona. John Becklaw, writes a review in the Arizona Republic under the headline: "Gormans-Father and Son Rebels in Indian Art"

1965 - R.C. hold his first exhibition at the Manchester in Taos, New Mexico. The show sells out.

1966 - R.C. makes his first ever lithographs with Jose Sanchez in Mexico City.

1966 - R.C. helps organize American Indian Arts Group in San Francisco and serves as chairman of its painting committee.

1968 - R.C. borrows money from his parents to purchase the Manchester Gallery. He renames it the Navajo Gallery. It is the first Native American owned fine art gallery. He opens with 55 artists showing.

1971 - R.C. resumes his lithography and makes his first Lithographs with the Tamarind Institute in Albuquerque, New Mexico. He will go on to produce at least 52 lithographs between 1971 and 1975 with Tamarind.

1973 - R.C. attends the Metropolitan Museum of Art's Masterworks from the Museum of the American Indian in New York City. He is the only living artist to be included in the show and his artwork is used for the front and back cover of the show's catalog. In their review of the show, the New York Times refers to R.C. Gorman as "the Picasso of American-Indian art" (an honor as Picasso had died at 91 in France in April of that same year).

1974 - R.C. Gorman's paintings are among the arts added to the Museum of the American Indian on Broadway in New York City. In an article, the New York Times says, "no one stands higher among living American Indian painters."

Gorman moved from California to New Mexico, opening the Navajo Gallery in Taos in 1968. It was the first Native American-owned art gallery.

In 1973, he was the only living artist whose work was shown in the "Masterworks from the Museum of the American Indian" exhibition held at Metropolitan Museum in New York City. Two of his pieces was selected for the cover of the exhibit's catalog.

Gorman's work was explored in a series on American Indian artists for the Public Broadcasting System (PBS). Other artists in the series included Helen Hardin, Charles Loloma, Allan Houser, Joseph Lonewolf, and Fritz Scholder.

Later life
In 1998, he donated art for Tom Udall's campaign for election to the U.S. House of Representatives. On April 1, 2003, Gorman donated his personal library to Diné College at the request of the college's president, Cassandra Manuelito-Kerkvliet.

On September 18, 2005, Gorman fell at his home and was taken to Holy Cross Hospital in Taos. On September 26, he was transferred to University of New Mexico Hospital (in Albuquerque). He died at age 74 on November 3. New Mexico governor Bill Richardson ordered flags flown at half-staff in his honor.

Influences
Gorman learned about the work of the Mexican social realists: Diego Rivera, David Siqueiros, and Rufino Tamayo.  He became inspired by their colors and forms to change from abstraction to abstract realism.  He used abstract forms and shapes to create his own unique, personal realistic style, recognizable to all who are acquainted with his work. While in Mexico, he also learned stone lithography from a master printer, Jose Sanchez. He used lithography throughout his life as a means of making original multiple images of his inspirations, often working by drawing directly on the stones from which the lithographs were printed.

Awards and honors
 R. C. Gorman Day, State of New Mexico (January 8, 1979)
 R. C. Gorman Day, San Francisco, California (March 18, 1986)
 New Mexico's Governor's Award of Excellence (1989) 
 Alumnae of the Year Award, National Association of Colleges and Universities (November 1993)
 Camino Real Award, Hispanic Chamber of Commerce, Santa Fe, New Mexico (1995)
 Los Amigos del Turismo Cultural Award, Santa Fe, New Mexico (1996)
 A Golden Palm Star on the Palm Springs Walk of Stars was dedicated to him (2002).
 After Gorman's death, New Mexico governor Bill Richardson ordered flags flown at half-staff in his honor (2005)

References

Further reading

1931 births
2005 deaths
20th-century American painters
20th-century American printmakers
20th-century American sculptors
20th-century ceramists
21st-century American painters
21st-century ceramists
American ceramists
American lithographers
American male painters
American male sculptors
Artists from Taos, New Mexico
Native American male artists
Navajo artists
Northern Arizona University alumni
People from Chinle, Arizona
People from Taos, New Mexico
San Francisco State University alumni
Sculptors from Arizona
Sculptors from New Mexico
Mexico City College alumni
20th-century Native Americans
21st-century Native Americans
20th-century American male artists
American LGBT artists
LGBT Native Americans
20th-century lithographers